The CONCACAF Under-20 Championship is the second longest running international association football event in the North America, Central America and the Caribbean region, CONCACAF, and is the qualification tournament for the FIFA U-20 World Cup. The format of the tournament has undergone changes over the years. The tournament proper is currently played with a first round of four round-robin groups from which the top two sides from each group advance to a single-elimination championship round.

Results

CONCACAF Youth Tournaments era

FIFA U-20 World Cup qualifying tournament era 
The format of the tournament was changed beginning with the 1998 tournament and ending with the 2007 tournament. In the five tournaments during that time the top eight teams in the region were divided into two groups of four, each group hosted by a separate nation, and the top two sides from each group qualified for the FIFA U-20 World Cup. There was no championship round within the CONCACAF region. The tournament served solely to qualify the four allotments given to CONCACAF by FIFA for the U-20 World Cup.

CONCACAF U-20 Championship era 
Beginning with the 2009 FIFA U-20 World Cup tournament, the CONCACAF region returned to a championship-style tournament in which all four semifinalists qualify for the FIFA U-20 World Cup. The reintroduction of a championship round was done to reinvigorate the competition.

The competition changed its format in 2015. The two group winners would secure a place in the final and the U-20 World Cup, the groups' second and third placed teams would compete in a repechage play-off to determine the qualifiers for the U-20 World Cup. The number of guaranteed games per team was increased from 2 to 5 and the semi-final stage was removed. 

The competition changed its format again in 2017. A second group stage was added, with the winners and runners-up of this stage qualifying for the U-20 World Cup and the winners securing a place in the final.

The competition changed its format again in 2020. A knockout stage was added, with the semi-finalists qualifying for the U-20 World Cup.

Winners by country

Note: no championship titles or runners-ups between 1998 and 2007.

Overall team records
In this ranking 3 points are awarded for a win, 1 for a draw and 0 for a loss. As per statistical convention in football, matches decided in extra time are counted as wins and losses, while matches decided by penalty shoot-outs are counted as draws. Teams are ranked by total points, then by goal difference, then by goals scored.

Comprehensive team results by tournament

Legend

 – Champions
 – Runners-up
 – Third place
 – Fourth place
 – Semifinals
5th – Fifth place
 – Top 4
QF – Quarterfinals
R16 – Round of 16
GS – Group stage
R1 – First round (1st Group stage)
R2 – Second round (2nd Group stage)
FS – Final stage (group stage)
Q – Qualified for upcoming tournament
 — Hosts
 •  – Did not qualify
 ×  – Did not enter
 ×  – Withdrew before qualification
 — Withdrew/Disqualified after qualification
 — Team did not exist
 — Not part of CONCACAF

Notes

Player awards

Top goalscorers

Title winning coaches

See also

 CONCACAF
 CONCACAF Under-17 Championship
 CONCACAF Women's U-20 Championship
 FIFA U-20 World Cup

References

External links
 Official Site
 Results by RSSSF

 
Under
Under-20 association football
Recurring sporting events established in 1962